The following are lists of the most populous fully defined incorporated settlements in Nigeria by population. This page consists three different tables, with different kinds of settlements; a list for "defined cities", listing the population, strictly within the defined city limits, a list for "urban area" population, and another list for the population within metropolitan areas.

Lists

Defined cities/towns
Nigerian cities are categorized into three types; there is the "Metropolis", which is characterized with having more than one Local Government Areas (LGAs). This type of cities are usually formed when large municipalities are split into smaller LGAs, to aid efficient administration and management, or when small towns grow and merge into existing large cities, or both; some are also formed when urban areas of multiple LGAs merge as a result of growth and are now fully defined as a single settlement,  Another type of settlement is the "Municipality", which is basically an LGA that is fully defined as its own city or town. This type of cities are usually mid-sized, although some large cities also exist as a single LGA. The third type of settlement is the "village", which is basically grouped together with several other villages into one sizeable LGA.

The following table lists fully defined incorporated cities in Nigeria, with a population of at least 100,000, as declared by the Nigerian National Population Commission in the 2006 National census. This list refers only to the population of individual cities within their defined limits, which does not include other distinct communities or extended suburban areas within urban agglomerations. A city is displayed in bold if it is a state or federal capital, and in italics if it is the most populous city in the state.

Urban areas
An urban area is a continuously built up land mass of urban development that is within a labor market, without regard for administrative or city boundaries. An urban area is a human settlement with high population density and infrastructure of built environment.

This is section lists contiguous urban areas in Nigeria, with a population of at least 500,000. The figures here have been taken from Demographia's "World Urban Areas" study 2016. Demographia uses maps, satellite photographs to estimate continuous urbanization.

See also
List of cities in Nigeria
List of populated places in Nigeria
Lists of villages in Nigeria

Notes

References

Further reading

External links

 
 
 
Nigeria
Cities by population